Chapel-en-le-Frith High School is a mixed gender comprehensive school in Chapel-en-le-Frith in the county of Derbyshire, England. It serves pupils aged 11 to 16 from the town and surrounding areas.

The building is maintained by Interserve. Eden Foodservice provide the catering.

History
The school was established in 1952 as Chapel-en-le-Frith Secondary Modern. It has since been renamed 3 times; Long Lane Comprehensive School, Chapel-en-le-Frith County Secondary School and finally Chapel-en-le-Frith High School.

In 2005 was rebuilt on the original playing fields of the school and the former site was then redeveloped as the school's new sports fields. The school is housed in a specially built one-piece building.

There have only been four headteachers to date, Stuart Ash retiring in the 2010/11 academic year and replaced by current headteacher, Simon Grieves.

Admissions
Admission is open to all pupils aged 11–16 residing in the catchment area.  the number of pupils on roll is 932.

Academic performance
In 2015, 71% of the school's pupils achieved at least five A*–C GCSE results including maths and English. This was significantly above the averages nationally and for the Derbyshire Local Education Authority, 53.8% and 55.9% respectively.
 It does not have a sixth form.

The school was judged to be good by Ofsted on 15 May 2019.

Daily life

Uniform
The school uniform is a white polo shirt with the school motto ("Striving for Excellence") on the chest, a red stripe on the collar and sleeves; a black sweatshirt with the school emblem, and black trousers. It used to be a classic shirt-and-tie uniform, but changed when the school moved into the new building.

Houses
The four school houses (Bowden, Combs, Hollins and Kinder) are named after local hills in the area.

Learning Support department
The department has a selection of specially trained staff who work full-time undertaking special lessons with those pupils who have been deemed to need support.

Notable former pupils
Former High Peak Constituency MP Andrew Bingham was a pupil at the school, when it was called Long Lane Comprehensive.
Paralympic triple Gold Medallist Anthony Kappes MBE went to the school.

References

External links
Official website

Secondary schools in Derbyshire
Educational institutions established in 1952
Peak District
1952 establishments in England
Community schools in Derbyshire
Chapel-en-le-Frith